Marlon Blue Babic (born 19 May 1988) is an Austrian-English raised actor and model. He has appeared in films such as Lion, The Royals, Episodes, Fury and Goitaca.

Early life
Marlon Blue was born in Vienna, Austria.

Career
Blue worked part-time as a craftsman in London when discovered by Ford Models and AD Model Management in Perth, Australia. He has modelled for brands such as Gareth Pugh, Chanel, Max Mara, GANT, Armani, Gucci, Marc Stone and Diesel. After several years on the runway he began studying at BAW's Studio in Paris and at Stella Adler`s Studio in New York City.

He participated in a poetic short film, created by Joseph Bleu and Fabien Montique, in memory of Marguerite Duras, released through the site frillr.com and later released a series of drawings through the book Lucielos.

2014, he received his first role in David Ayer`s Fury followed by appearances in TV series The Royals, Episodes and TV commercial Coco Mademoiselle directed by Joe Wright for Chanel French perfume.

2015, in published video game Guitar Hero from Neversoft Blue voiced Circle with The Black Keys . In 2015, he appeared in films such as Lion, Blue Rainbow, 27, Memory Lane, Fighting Heart, The Singleton, I'm Still Here, Dream a Life and The Luka State's music video "Rain". 2016, in Sylvie Verheyde's drama Sex Doll.

By June 2016, Blue had been cast as the protagonist, alongside Leandro Firmino, in Rodrigo Rodrigues's adventure drama Goitaca, with his character later specified as Candea. He attended filming in the jungle of Brazil after spending several weeks in the jungle of Ecuador amongst indigenous tribes near the Napo River.

Personal life
Blue started dating fellow model Isabelle Lenvin from July 2014 until December 2015.

Filmography

Film

Television

Theatre

Commercial

Music

Video games

Awards and nominations

References

External links

 
 
 
 

1988 births
Living people
Male actors from London
Austrian male film actors
English male film actors
English male television actors
English male stage actors
English male models
English male singers
Austrian emigrants to the United Kingdom
21st-century English male actors
21st-century English singers
21st-century British male singers